Toriumi is a surname. Notable people with the surname include:

Akira Toriumi, Japanese engineer
Hisayuki Toriumi (1941–2009), Japanese filmmaker
Jinzō Toriumi (1929–2008), Japanese screenwriter
Katsumi Toriumi, Japanese voice actor
Kōsuke Toriumi, Japanese voice actor